Broadway Limited is a 1941 American film directed by Gordon Douglas and starring Victor McLaglen, Dennis O'Keefe and ZaSu Pitts. The film takes its name from the Broadway Limited train that the Pennsylvania Railroad used to run between New York and Chicago.

Plot
Movie director Ivan Ivanski (Leonid Kinskey) stages a publicity stunt involving  actress April Tremaine (Marjorie Woodworth), railway worker Mike Monohan (Victor McLaglen), and a baby (Gay Ellen Dakin), which turns into a real kidnapping, leaving Tremaine caught in the middle.

Cast
Victor McLaglen as Maurice "Mike" Monohan
Marjorie Woodworth as April Tremaine / Mary Potter
Dennis O'Keefe as Dr. Harvey North
Patsy Kelly as Patsy Riley
ZaSu Pitts as Myra Pottle
Leonid Kinskey as Ivan Makail Ivanski
George E. Stone as Lefty
Gay Ellen Dakin as Baby
Charles C. Wilson as Detective
John Sheehan as Conductor
Edgar Edwards as State Trooper
Eric Alden as State Trooper
Sam McDaniel as Train Porter
J. Farrell McDonald as RR Line Supt. Mulcahy (uncredited)

References

External links

1941 films
1941 romantic comedy films
American romantic comedy films
American screwball comedy films
American black-and-white films
Films directed by Gordon Douglas
Films about actors
Rail transport films
United Artists films
Publicity stunts in fiction
1940s screwball comedy films
1940s English-language films
1940s American films